Yuki Uchiyama may refer to:

Yuki Uchiyama (artistic gymnast), Japanese artistic gymnast
Yuki Uchiyama (footballer), Japanese footballer